Emmalocera phaeoneura is a species of moth of the family Pyralidae. It was described by George Hampson in 1918 and is found in Taiwan.

References

Moths described in 1918
Emmalocera